Rufina Peter is a Papua New Guinean agricultural economist and politician. Until her election to the National Parliament on 5 August 2022, Papua New Guinea (PNG) was one of only three countries without a woman in parliament. She was also elected as Governor of Central Province in the 2022 general election, becoming the province's first female governor.

Early life and education
One of eight children, Peter attended a Catholic school in Tapini in the hilly, northwestern part of Central Province. Her father did not earn enough to support four children in high school and she had to work while at school to help pay for the fees. She obtained an undergraduate degree in agriculture from the Papua New Guinea University of Technology in Lae between 1985 and 1988 and a master's degree in agricultural economics from the University of New England, in Armidale, New South Wales, between 1990 and 1992. She was a participant in the 2013–2014 Australian Rural Leadership Program.

Career
Peter's first job was as an economist with the PNG Cocoa Board. She then became a first assistant secretary at the government's Department of Agriculture and Livestock, before moving to the Institute of National Affairs where, among other activities, she supported the PNG Women in Agriculture Development Foundation. After a spell at the Department of Provincial & Local Government Affairs, she joined the Bank of Papua New Guinea in 2017.

Political career
Peter first stood as a candidate in the 2017 Papua New Guinean general election, but was unsuccessful. She did, however, win the highest vote of any female candidate in the country. At that time she attributed the lack of success of women in PNG politics to the general feeling in the country that politics is a man's world and that women are ill-equipped to become political leaders. She said that the current political environment promotes corrupt practices and there were insufficient resources available for candidates to campaign. One factor she cited was that tribal leaders play a big role in voters' decisions, and they are nearly all men. In the 2022 general election she was one of 167 women running for the 118 seats, compared with 3,458 men. She was successful in the Central Province Regional seat, which meant that she became the governor of the province as well as a member of parliament. Papua New Guinea follows a preferential voting system and, after all votes had been tallied, she had beaten her rival, the incumbent, Robert Agarobe, by 62,361 votes to 58,917. Peter stood as a member of the People’s National Congress Party. Before her election, Papua New Guinea was one of only three countries without a woman in parliament. Four days later, Kessy Sawang was also elected.

See also
The eight other women elected to the Papua New Guinea parliament:
Josephine Abaijah, 1972–1982; 1997–2012
Waliyato Clowes, 1977–82
Nahau Rooney, 1977–87
Carol Kidu, 2002–2012
Julie Soso, 2012–2017
Loujaya Kousa, 2012–2017
Delilah Gore, 2012–2017
Kessy Sawang, 2022–

References

External links
Declaration of Peter's electoral victory and her speech

Living people
Date of birth unknown
Governors of Central Province (Papua New Guinea)
Members of the National Parliament of Papua New Guinea
Members of the Central Provincial Assembly
Papua New Guinean women in politics
People's National Congress (Papua New Guinea) politicians
21st-century women politicians
Women members of the National Parliament of Papua New Guinea
Papua New Guinean economists
Papua New Guinea University of Technology alumni
University of New England (Australia) alumni
Year of birth missing (living people)